Association Sportive Bakaridjan de Barouéli is a Malian football club. The team is based in the city of Barouéli, Segou Region. Founded 23 May 1989, their colors are Red and Green, and their slogan is, "Travail – Discipline-Unité".

Achievements
 Malien Cup: 0
2002–03 : Eliminated in group of sixteen by Renaissance AC of Ségou (1–0)
2003–04 : Eliminated in group of eight by Djoliba AC of Bamako (2–1)
2004–05 : Eliminated in group of eight by  Débo Club de Mopti of Mopti (2–1)
2005–06 : Eliminated in Quarter-finals by JS Centre Salif Keita of Bamako (2–1)
2006–07 : Finalists in 47th cup by Djoliba AC of Bamako (2–0)

 Malian Première Division: 0
2004–05 : Promoted from D1
2005–06 : 12th in Première Division
2006–07 : 8th in Première Division
2007–08 : 4th in Première Division after 6 rounds with 11 points

 Mali Super Cup:

Squad

References
 https://web.archive.org/web/20141221083223/http://www.footmali.com/ (Le football au Mali)
 Portions of this article were translated from the French Wikipedia article Association Sportive Bakaridjan de Barouéli.
Mali 2007/08 Championnat National Première Division
Mali 2006/07 Championnat National Première Division Rec.Sport.Soccer Statistics Foundation, retrieved 2008-03-04. Rec.Sport.Soccer Statistics Foundation, retrieved 2008-03-04.
Mali – List of Champions Rec.Sport.Soccer Statistics Foundation, retrieved 2008-03-04.
Mali – List of Cup Winners Rec.Sport.Soccer Statistics Foundation, retrieved 2008-03-04.

B
1989 establishments in Mali